Brissus obesus is a species of sea urchins of the family Brissidae. Their armour is covered with spines. Brissus obesus was first scientifically described in 1867 by Verrill.

References 

Animals described in 1867
obesus